The following is a list of notable deaths in August 2018.

Entries for each day are listed alphabetically by surname. A typical entry lists information in the following sequence:
 Name, age, country of citizenship at birth, subsequent country of citizenship (if applicable), reason for notability, cause of death (if known), and reference.

August 2018

1
Alija Behmen, 77, Bosnian politician, PM of Bosnia and Herzegovina federation (2001–2003) and Mayor of Sarajevo (2009–2013).
Garnet Bloomfield, 89, Canadian politician, MP for London—Middlesex (1980–1984).
Gaqo Çako, 83, Albanian opera singer.
Mary Carlisle, 104, American actress (College Humor, Doctor Rhythm, Dead Men Walk).
Maruja Carrasco, 74, Spanish botanist, herbalist and academic (Complutense University of Madrid, University of Chicago).
David I. Cleland, 92, American engineer and writer.
Cui Xiuwen, 50–51, Chinese artist.
Jack Gaffney, 88, Australian footballer (Fitzroy) and lawyer.
Rick Genest, 32, Canadian fashion model and actor (Carny, 47 Ronin), fall.
Howard Grant, 79, American jockey.
Jan Kirsznik, 84, Polish rock saxophonist.
Eleonore Koch, 92, German-born Brazilian painter and sculptor.
Frédéric Kyburz, 74, Swiss Olympic judoka.
Fakir Musafar, 87, American performance artist and modern primitive proponent, lung cancer.
Jüri Rätsep, 83, Estonian politician and judge, magistrate of the Supreme Court (1993–2002).
Celeste Rodrigues, 95, Portuguese fado singer.
Hasanaga Sadigov, 67, Azerbaijani ashik musician, cancer.
Jakob Schönenberger, 86, Swiss oberst, banker (Swiss National Bank) and politician, member of Council of States (1979–1991).
Jalees Sherwani, 70, Indian screenwriter and lyricist.
Bhishma Narain Singh, 85, Indian politician, Governor of Assam (1984–1989) and Tamil Nadu (1991–1993).
John Tangi, 67, Niuean-born Cook Island politician.
Nancy Tuckerman, 89, American secretary, White House Social Secretary (1963), chronic obstructive pulmonary disease.
Umbayee, 66, Indian ghazal singer, cancer.
Rolf Valtin, 93, American soccer player.
Hannie van Leeuwen, 92, Dutch politician, Senator (1995–2007).
Stefano Vetrano, 95, Italian politician, Deputy (1968–1975).
Taylor Whitley, 38, American football player (Miami Dolphins, Denver Broncos, Washington Redskins).
Rotraut Wisskirchen, 82, German biblical archaeologist and academic, Order of Merit (2011).

2
Neil Argo, 71, American composer (Wild America, Mission: Impossible), heart failure.
Shaharuddin Badaruddin, 55, Malaysian politician, colon cancer.
Bob Berry, 102, New Zealand dendrologist.
A. K. Bose, 69, Indian politician, cardiac arrest.
Marcial, 77, Brazilian footballer.
Givi Chikvanaia, 79, Georgian water polo player, Olympic silver medalist (1960, 1968).
Gabriel Covarrubias Ibarra, 88, Mexican politician, Senator (1997–2000), Mayor of Guadalajara (1989–1992).
Tom Cox, 88, British politician, MP for Wandsworth Central (1970–1974) and Tooting (1974–2005).
Armand de Las Cuevas, 50, French racing cyclist, suicide.
Harald Hauptmann, 82, Czech-born German prehistorian, archaeologist and academic (Heidelberg University), member of Serbian Academy of Sciences and Arts.
Yogi Huyghebaert, 74, Canadian politician, Saskatchewan MLA (2000–2016).
Ûssarĸak K'ujaukitsoĸ, 70, Greenlandic Inuit politician and human rights activist, member of the Inatsisartut (1984–1995).
Brian Kelly, 75, English footballer.
Herbert King, 55, Colombian actor (Pasión de Gavilanes, Guajira, Loving Pablo), heart attack.
Salvatore Meleleo, 89, Italian politician, Deputy (1983–1994) and Senator (2001–2006).
Winston Ntshona, 76, South African actor (Marigolds in August) and playwright (The Island, Sizwe Banzi Is Dead), Tony winner (1975).
Vladimír Plaček, 53, Czech politician and physician, Senator (since 2012).
Mihai Radu Pricop, 68, Romanian politician, Senator (2000–2004).
Heinz Rökker, 97, German night fighter pilot during World War II.
Daan Schrijvers, 76, Dutch footballer (national team, AFC DWS, PSV Eindhoven, NAC Breda).
Darrel Sutton, 71, Canadian curler.
Viktor Tyumenev, 61, Russian ice hockey player, Olympic champion (1984).
María José la Valenciana, 44, Spanish transsexual sex worker and internet personality.
Bill Wattenburg, 82, American engineer, author, and radio talk show host, cancer.
Ferdinand Willeit, 79, Italian politician, Deputy (1987–1992), heart attack.

3
Matija Barl, 78, Slovene actor (Kekec).
Joseph C. Burke, 86, American educator and academic, President of the State University of New York at Plattsburgh (1974–1986).
Terry Bush, 75, English footballer (Bristol City).
Carlos Buttice, 75, Argentine footballer (Unión Española, Bahia, CASLA).
Raffaele Castielli, 91, Italian Roman Catholic prelate, Bishop of Lucera–Troia (1987–1996).
Carlos Chávez, 59, Bolivian football administrator, cancer.
Ingrid Espelid Hovig, 94, Norwegian television chef and cookbook author.
Cliff Huxford, 81, English football player (Southampton, Exeter City) and manager.
Koulla Kakoulli, 56, British musician, dominatrix and bodybuilder.
Reinhart Langer, 97, German-born New Zealand plant physiologist and academic (Lincoln University).
John Loone, 87, Australian politician, member of the Tasmanian Legislative Council (1989–2001).
Murray Matthewson, 73, New Zealand hand surgeon.
Moshé Mizrahi, 86, Egyptian-born Israeli film director (Madame Rosa, Every Time We Say Goodbye, The House on Chelouche Street), Oscar winner (1978).
John Schella, 71, Canadian ice hockey player (Vancouver Canucks, Houston Aeros).
Zbigniew Ścibor-Rylski, 101, Polish Air Force officer (Warsaw Uprising) and brigadier general.
Piotr Szulkin, 68, Polish film director (The War of the Worlds: Next Century, O-Bi, O-Ba: The End of Civilization).
Ronnie Taylor, 93, British cinematographer (Gandhi, Cry Freedom, A Chorus Line), Oscar winner (1983).
Zhang Baosheng, 57–58, Chinese qigong master.

4
Sergey Ambartsumian, 96, Armenian scientist, member of Supreme Soviet of the Soviet Union (1979–1984).
Afsar Amed, 58, Indian Bengali writer.
Lorrie Collins, 76, American rockabilly singer (The Collins Kids).
Delwyn Costello, 58, New Zealand cricketer.
Lluïsa Forrellad, 91, Spanish writer.
Stephen Goodson, South African banker and Holocaust denier, Director of the Reserve Bank (2003–2012).
Donald Hunt, 88, British choral conductor.
Brian Illman, 80, Australian cricketer.
Anita Miller, 91, American author and publisher, co-founder of Academy Chicago Publishers.
Josy Moinet, 88, French politician, Senator for Charente-Maritime (1973–1989), Mayor of Saint-Rogatien (1959–2008).
Tommy Peoples, 70, Irish fiddler (The Bothy Band).
Arsène Tchakarian, 101, Armenian-born French resistance fighter (FTP-MOI).
Karma Topden, 77, Indian Sikkimese politician, member of the Rajya Sabha (1988–1993, 1994–2000), Ambassador to Mongolia.
Masahiko Tsugawa, 78, Japanese actor (Otoko wa Tsurai yo, Godzilla, Mothra and King Ghidorah: Giant Monsters All-Out Attack, Tampopo).
Myron White, 61, American baseball player (Los Angeles Dodgers).

5
Majid Al-Majid, 52, Saudi folk singer, shot.
Bernard F. Burke, 90, American astronomer.
Miguel Ángel Campano, 70, Spanish painter.
Ulises Aurelio Casiano Vargas, 84, Puerto Rican Roman Catholic prelate, Bishop of Mayagüez (1976–2011).
Barry Chuckle, 73, English children's entertainer (ChuckleVision), bone cancer.
Robert Dugard, 76, British speedway rider and promoter.
Tom Heckert Jr., 51, American football executive (Cleveland Browns, Philadelphia Eagles), amyloidosis.
David Landsberg, 73, American actor (C.P.O. Sharkey, Shoot the Moon) and screenwriter (Cosby), complications from surgery.
Gerry Lenfest, 88, American media executive (Triangle Publications, TelVue) and philanthropist (Columbia University).
Ellen Joyce Loo, 32, Canadian-born Hong Kong singer (at17), suicide by jumping.
Harry Mares, 79, American politician, member of the Minnesota House of Representatives (1995–2002).
Lauri Mononen, 68, Finnish Olympic ice hockey player (1972).  
Alan Rabinowitz, 64, American conservationist and zoologist, founder president of Panthera Corporation, leukemia.
Charlotte Rae, 92, American actress (The Facts of Life, Diff'rent Strokes, 101 Dalmatians: The Series), bone cancer.
Aji Muhammad Salehuddin II, 93, Indonesian royal, Sultan of Kutai (since 1999).
John Shaw, 86, Australian cricketer.
Matthew Sweeney, 65, Irish poet, motor neurone disease.
Nev Warburton, 86, Australian politician, Leader of the Opposition of Queensland (1984–1988).
Mary E. White, 92, South African-born Australian paleobotanist and author, homicide by overdose.

6
Patricia Benoit, 91, American actress (Mister Peepers).
Kamrul Hasan Bhuiyan, 66, Bangladeshi military officer and writer.
Rosa Maria Carrasco i Azemar, 82, Spanish politician, co-founder of Democrats of Catalonia.
Anthony Catt, 84, English cricketer (Kent).
R. K. Dhawan, 81, Indian politician.
Christian Habicht, 92, German historian (Ancient Greece).
Margaret Heckler, 87, American politician and diplomat, Ambassador to Ireland (1986–1989), Secretary of Health and Human Services (1983–1985), member of the U.S. House of Representatives (1967–1983), cardiac arrest.
Nat Indrapana, 80, Thai sports executive, Vice Minister of Tourism and Sports (2007–2008), Vice President of the World Taekwondo Federation (1999–2009).
Jimmy il Fenomeno, 86, Italian actor.
Nicole Kullen, 38, Australian Paralympic equestrian, meningococcal disease.
Paul Laxalt, 96, American politician, Governor of Nevada (1967–1971), member of the U.S. Senate (1974–1987).
Leonard Lewinsohn, 64–65, American Islamic scholar.
Sanaa Mazhar, 85, Egyptian actress.
Robert A. Plane, 90, American chemist, vintner and academic administrator, President of Clarkson University (1974–1985) and Wells College (1991–1995), founder of Cayuga Lake AVA.
Pete Richens, 65, English screenwriter (The Comic Strip Presents).
Joël Robuchon, 73, French chef and cookbook author, Meilleur Ouvrier de France winner 1976, complications from pancreatic cancer.
William E. Schluter, 90, American politician, member of the New Jersey Legislature (1968–1974, 1987–2002).
Anya Krugovoy Silver, 49, American poet, breast cancer.
Dennis Thrower, 80, English footballer (Ipswich Town).

7
Étienne Chicot, 69, French actor (The Da Vinci Code) and composer.
John Ciaccia, 85, Italian-born Canadian politician, member of the National Assembly of Quebec for Mont-Royal (1973–1998).
David Coates, 71, British political economist.
Andrew Coburn, 86, American author.
John Doaninoel, 68, Papua New Guinean Roman Catholic prelate, Auxiliary Bishop of Honiara (since 2011).
Dumitru Fărcaș, 80, Romanian tárogató player.
Arvonne Fraser, 92, American women's rights activist, Ambassador to the United Nations Commission on the Status of Women (1993–1994).
Gustavo Giagnoni, 86, Italian football player (Mantova) and manager (Milan, Roma).
Nan Joyce, 77–78, Irish human rights activist (Irish Travellers).
M. Karunanidhi, 94, Indian politician and writer, Chief Minister of Tamil Nadu (1969–1971, 1971–1976, 1989–1991, 1996–2001, 2006–2011), multiple organ failure.
Richard H. Kline, 91, American cinematographer (King Kong, Star Trek: The Motion Picture, Camelot).
Anton Lehmden, 89, Austrian painter.
Liu Guangding, 88, Chinese marine geologist, member of the Chinese Academy of Sciences.
Stan Mikita, 78, Slovak-born Canadian Hall of Fame ice hockey player (Chicago Blackhawks, St. Catharines Teepees), NHL champion (1961).
Aaron Monsonego, 90, Moroccan religious leader, Chief Rabbi (since 1994).
Enno Patalas, 88, German film historian, restorer and collector.
Joel H. Silbey, 84, American historian.
Rika Vayani, 56, Greek actress, journalist and writer, lung cancer.
Gerald Weinberg, 84, American computer scientist. 
Robley Wilson, 88, American writer.

8
Mario Alinei, 91, Italian linguist.
Nicholas Bett, 28, Kenyan hurdler, world champion (2015), traffic collision.
Göran Bundy, 97, Swedish diplomat, Ambassador to Kuwait, Qatar, Bahrain and United Arab Emirates (1977–1980) and Iran (1980–1985).
Katie Cannon, 68, American theologian, leukemia.
Ronald Crawford, 82, Australian Olympic racewalker (1956, 1960, 1964).
Arthur Davies, 77, Welsh opera singer.
Willie Dille, 53, Dutch politician, member of the House of Representatives (2010–2012), suicide.
Wendell Erickson, 93, American politician, member of the Minnesota House of Representatives (1965–1987).
Pál Fábry, 99, Hungarian politician, MNA (1947).
Robert Hugh Ferrell, 97, American historian and author.
John Glines, 84, American theatre producer (Torch Song Trilogy, As Is, Whoop-Dee-Doo!) and playwright.
Xenia Gratsos, 78, Greek-American actress.
Dave Hargreaves, 63, English footballer (Accrington Stanley).
Jarrod Lyle, 36, Australian golfer, acute myeloid leukaemia.
Hernán Masanés, 86, Chilean Olympic cyclist.
Linda Mkhize, 37, South African rapper and DJ, hemosuccus pancreaticus.
Takeshi Onaga, 67, Japanese politician, Governor of Okinawa Prefecture (since 2014), Mayor of Naha (2000–2014), pancreatic cancer.
Élise Paré-Tousignant, 81, Canadian music administrator and educator.
Philip Riteman, 96, Polish-born Canadian lecturer and Holocaust survivor.
Richard Searby, 87, Australian lawyer.
Mikhail Shakhov, 86, Ukrainian wrestler, Olympic bronze medalist (1956).
Richard Sipe, 85, American sociologist, multiple organ failure.

9
Tamara Degtyaryova, 74, Russian actress (Eternal Call, Nikolai Vavilov).
Donald F. Holcomb, 92, American physicist.
Billy Ray Irick, 59, American convicted murderer, execution by lethal injection.
John Kennedy, 77, American baseball player (Boston Red Sox, Los Angeles Dodgers, Washington Senators).
Manfred Melzer, 74, German Roman Catholic prelate, Auxiliary Bishop of Cologne (1995–2015).
Mehrdad Pahlbod, 101, Iranian royal and politician, Minister of Culture and Art (1964–1978).
Carol Springer, 81, American politician, State Treasurer of Arizona (1998–2003).

10
Emmanuel C. Aguma, Nigerian politician, Attorney General of Rivers State (since 2015).
Anant Bajaj, 41, Indian businessman (Bajaj Electricals), heart attack.
Peter Berck, 68, American economist.
Andrey Budnik, 65, Soviet-Russian diplomat, Ambassador to Pakistan (2009–2013) and Nepal (since 2015).
Paul Cantor, 76, Canadian lawyer.
William Corbett, 75, American poet, pancreatic cancer.
László Fábián, 82, Hungarian sprint canoeist, Olympic (1956) and world champion (1958, 1963, 1966).
Árpád Fazekas, 88, Hungarian footballer (national team, FC Bayern Munich).
Robert J. LeRoy, 74, Canadian chemist.
Fernando Llort, 69, Salvadoran artist.
Dawn Mabalon, 45, American academic, asthma attack.
Mahmut Makal, 88, Turkish writer.
Jim McKiernan, 73, Irish-born Australian politician, Senator (1984–2002), cancer.
Katherine Nelson, 87–88, American psychologist.
A. R. Schwartz, 92, American politician, member of the Texas House of Representatives (1955–1959) and Senate (1960–1981), heart attack.
Kin Sugai, 92, Japanese actress (Godzilla, Dodes'ka-den, The Funeral), heart failure.
Mohammed Awad al-Zayyud, 62, Jordanian politician, Secretary-General of Islamic Action Front, cancer.

11
Bùi Tín, 90, Vietnamese military officer and dissident, kidney failure.
Pierre Coustillas, 88, French literary scholar (George Gissing) and academic (University of Lille).
Terry A. Davis, 48, American computer programmer (TempleOS), struck by train.
Morris G. Hallock, 92, American politician, member of the South Dakota House of Representatives (1953–1954, 1967–1968).
Kazimierz Karabasz, 88, Polish documentarian.
Stanley Keleman, 86, American writer and chiropractor.
Li Chaoyi, 84, Chinese neurobiologist, academician of the Chinese Academy of Sciences.
Benno Müller-Hill, 85, German biologist and author.
Sir V. S. Naipaul, 85, Trinidadian-born British writer (A House for Mr Biswas), Nobel Prize laureate (2001).
Fabio Mamerto Rivas Santos, 86, Dominican Roman Catholic prelate, Bishop of Barahona (1976–1999).
John Smyth, 77, British barrister, heart attack.
Manch Wheeler, 79, American football player (Buffalo Bills).

12
Sheika Frayha Al-Ahmad, 74, Kuwaiti royal (House of Al Sabah) and philanthropist.
Samir Amin, 86, Egyptian-French Marxian economist.
Richard Lloyd Anderson, 92, American LDS Church historian (Brigham Young University).
Peter Chadwick, 87, British applied mathematician and physicist.
Bryant Giles, 90, Australian politician, MP (1968–1970).
Betty Gray, 96, Welsh table tennis player.
Ma Jin, 83, Chinese geophysicist and structural geologist.
Thomas J. Moran, 65, American executive (Mutual of America) and humanitarian (Concern Worldwide), Chancellor of Queen's University Belfast (since 2015).
Willy Rasmussen, 80, Norwegian Olympic javelin thrower (1960).
Michael Scott Rohan, 67, Scottish fantasy and science fiction author.
Steven T. Ross, 81, American military historian.
Kazimiera Utrata, 86, Polish actress.

13
Mark Baker, 71, American actor (Candide, Via Galactica, Swashbuckler).
Zvonko Bego, 77, Croatian footballer (Hajduk Split, Yugoslavia national team), Olympic champion (1960).
John Calder, 91, Canadian-born British publisher (Calder Publishing).
Salvatore Cantalupo, 59, Italian actor (Gomorrah).
John Carter, 95, American film editor (The Heartbreak Kid, Friday, Men of Honor).
Somnath Chatterjee, 89, Indian politician, Speaker of the Lok Sabha (2004–2009), multiple organ failure.
Tajul Islam Choudhury, 73, Bangladeshi politician, Opposition Chief Whip of Jatiya Sangsad.
Ian Dean, 48, English professional wrestler (ASW, WCW, NJPW), heart attack.
Santiago María García de la Rasilla, 81, Spanish-born Peruvian Roman Catholic prelate, Vicar Apostolic of Jaén en Perú (2005–2014).
Don Garrison, 93, American politician, member of the Texas House of Representatives (1961–1966).
Giam Choo Kwee, 76, Singaporean chess player.
Georges Hausemer, 61, Luxembourgian writer.
Unshō Ishizuka, 67, Japanese voice actor (Pokémon, JoJo's Bizarre Adventure, Cowboy Bebop), colon infection caused by esophageal tumor.
Mie Mie, 46, Burmese democracy activist, traffic collision.
Powell A. Moore, 80, American government official.
Ann Moss, 80, British literary historian.
Gerald Nazareth, 86, Hong Kong judge, Non-Permanent Judge of the Court of Final Appeal (1997–2012).
Jim Neidhart, 63, American professional wrestler (WWF, Mid-South, Stampede), head injury from fall.
Rico Pontvianne, 74, Mexican Olympic basketball player (1964, 1968), Pan American championship silver medalist (1967).
Miguel Ángel Sanz Bocos, 100, Spanish fighter pilot, last living aviator of the Civil War.
Golam Sarwar, 75, Bangladeshi journalist and founding editor of Samakal.
Gyula Szabó, 70, Hungarian Olympic sports shooter.

14
Brief Truce, 29, Irish racehorse.
Chemmanam Chacko, 92, Indian poet.
Sir Hugh Cortazzi, 94, British diplomat, Ambassador to Japan (1980–1984).
Charles Victor Grahmann, 87, American Roman Catholic prelate, Bishop of Dallas (1990–2007).
Mela Hudson, 31, American actress (Split Costs, Men in Black 3) and filmmaker.
Jill Janus, 42, American rock singer (Huntress), suicide.
Tomasz Jędrzejak, 39, Polish motorcycle speedway rider (national team), suspected suicide.
Itai Keisuke, 62, Japanese sumo wrestler.
Valentina Levko, 92, Russian opera and chamber singer.
Michael Persinger, 73, American-born Canadian psychology professor, neuroscience researcher (Laurentian University) and ufologist.
Mary Pratt, 83, Canadian painter.
Randy Rampage, 58, Canadian thrash metal singer and bassist (D.O.A., Annihilator, Stress Factor 9), heart attack.
Hakam Singh, 64, Indian race walker, Asian Games champion (1978), liver and kidney disease.
Balram Das Tandon, 90, Indian politician, Governor of Chhattisgarh (since 2014).
Mario Trebbi, 78, Italian footballer (Milan, Torino, national team).
Eduard Uspensky, 80, Russian author (Uncle Fedya, His Dog, and His Cat) and screenwriter (Gena the Crocodile, Plasticine Crow).

15
Malik Ghulam Abbas, 60, Pakistani politician, heart attack.
Kunihiro Abe, 50, Japanese animator (Gundam).
Rita Borsellino, 73, Italian anti-Mafia activist and politician, MEP (2009–2014), cancer.
Kenneth Bowles, 89, American computer scientist.
Peter Box, 86, Australian footballer (Footscray).
Martin Brandon-Bravo, 86, British politician, MP for Nottingham South (1983–1992).
Marie-Françoise Bucquet, 80, French pianist and teacher.
Pierre Camou, 72, French rugby union administrator.
Robert Everett, 97, American computer scientist.
Peter Fisher, 67, British physician, traffic collision.
François Garnier, 74, French Roman Catholic prelate, Archbishop of Cambrai (since 2000).
Edmond Haan, 94, French footballer (Strasbourg, national team).
Abu Bakr al-Jazaeri, 97, Algerian Islamic scholar and writer.
Vivian Matalon, 88, British theatre director.
Albert Millaire, 83, Canadian actor (Tartuffe, Le Misanthrope, Dom Juan), cancer.
Stuart Mitchell, 52, Scottish pianist and composer, lung cancer. (death announced on this date)
Allan Rune Pettersson, 82, Swedish author.
Marisa Porcel, 74, Spanish actress (Escenas de matrimonio, Aquí no hay quien viva, Médico de familia).
Sir John Shipley Rowlinson, 92, British chemist.
Momoko Sakura, 53, Japanese manga artist (Chibi Maruko-chan, Coji-Coji), breast cancer.
Sterling Stuckey, 86, American historian.
Ajit Wadekar, 77, Indian cricketer (Bombay, national team), cancer.

16
David Campion Acheson, 96, American attorney.
Benny Andersen, 88, Danish author, poet and pianist.
Michael Bettaney, 68, British MI5 agent and spy for the Soviet Union.
George Athan Billias, 99, American historian.
Glen Chin, 70, American actor (50 First Dates, Naked Gun 33 1/3: The Final Insult, Natural Born Killers).
Mohamed Demagh, 88, Algerian sculptor.
Donald E. Edwards, 81, American military officer and politician.
Aretha Franklin, 76, American Hall of Fame singer ("Respect", "Chain of Fools", "A Natural Woman"), pianist and songwriter, 18-time Grammy winner, pancreatic cancer.
Arne Johansson, 91, Swedish Olympic cyclist (1952).
Kim Yong-chun, 82, North Korean military officer and politician, Deputy (1986–1988), Chief of the KPA General Staff (1995–2007), heart attack.
Gavri Levy, 80, Israeli dancer and choreographer, Chairman of the Israel Football Association (1996–2003).
Michael McGuire, 92, British politician, MP for Ince (1964–1983) and Makerfield (1983–1987).
Count Prince Miller, 83, Jamaican-born British singer and actor (Desmond's), cancer.
Joseph Minj, 87, Indian Roman Catholic prelate, Bishop of Simdega (1993–2008).
Samir Salameh, 74, Palestinian-French visual artist.
Warwick Selvey, 78, Australian Olympic discus thrower (1960).
Yelena Shushunova, 49, Russian Hall of Fame gymnast, European (1985), World (1985, 1987), and Olympic champion (1988), complications from pneumonia.
Atal Bihari Vajpayee, 93, Indian politician, Prime Minister (1996, 1998–2004), Minister of External Affairs (1977–1979), multiple organ failure.
Wakako Yamauchi, 93, American playwright.
Rafif al-Yasiri, 33, Iraqi plastic surgeon and television host, drug overdose.

17
Bromley Armstrong, 92, Jamaican-born Canadian civil rights leader.
Bob Bass, 89, American basketball coach (Texas Tech Red Raiders) and executive (Charlotte Hornets, San Antonio Spurs), strokes.
Graham Bond, 81, Australian Olympic gymnast (1956, 1960, 1964).
Leonard Boswell, 84, American politician, member of the U.S. House of Representatives from Iowa's 3rd district (1997–2013), complications from pseudomyxoma peritonei.
Rodney Cass, 78, English cricketer (Essex, Tasmania, Worcestershire).
Jeremy Catto, 79, English historian.
Ezzatolah Entezami, 94, Iranian actor (The Cow, Hajji Washington, Once Upon a Time, Cinema).
Linton Freeman, 91, American sociologist.
Bunky Henry, 74, American golfer, complications following heart surgery.
Claudio Lolli, 68, Italian singer-songwriter, cancer.
David McReynolds, 88, American pacifist (War Resisters League) and magazine editor (Liberation), fall.
Paul Naumoff, 73, American football player (Detroit Lions).
Anne-Li Norberg, 64, Swedish actress, cancer.
Danny Pearson, 65, American R&B singer, liver cancer.
Dennis Randall, 73, American football player (New York Jets, Cincinnati Bengals).
Warwick Roger, 72, New Zealand journalist, founder of Metro magazine.
Hardayal Singh, 90, Indian field hockey player, Olympic champion (1956).
Sahar Taha, 61, Iraqi-born Lebanese musician and journalist.
Mike Timm, 81, American politician, member of the North Dakota House of Representatives (1972–1986, 1988–2006) and Speaker of the North Dakota House of Representatives (1996–1998).
Halima Xudoyberdiyeva, 71, Uzbekistani writer and poet.
Kurt Walker, 64, American ice hockey player (Toronto Maple Leafs), sepsis.

18
Kofi Annan, 80, Ghanaian diplomat, Secretary-General of the United Nations (1997–2006), Nobel Prize laureate (2001).
Tom Clark, 77, American poet and biographer, traffic collision.
Jack Costanzo, 98, American percussionist, complications from a ruptured aneurysm.
Eduard Frolov, 85, Russian historian.
Gaetano Gifuni, 86, Italian civil servant, Secretary General of the President (1992–2006) and Minister for Parliamentary Relations (1987).
Costas Kondylis, 78, American architect.
Hilary Lister, 46, British sailor, complications from reflex sympathetic dystrophy.
Gabriel López Zapiain, 75, Mexican footballer (Irapuato, Guadalajara, national team).
John E. McCarthy, 88, American Roman Catholic prelate, Bishop of Austin (1985–2001).
Ronnie Moore, 85, Australian-born New Zealand speedway rider, world champion (1954, 1959), lung cancer.
Pedro Queiroz Pereira, 69, Portuguese natural resource magnate and Formula Two driver, chairman of The Navigator Company and Semapa, heart attack.
Sir Peter Tapsell, 88, British politician, MP (1959–1964, 1966–2015) and Father of the House of Commons (2010–2015).
Robert Todd, 55, American filmmaker.
John Townend, 84, British politician, MP (1979–2001).
Ozzie Van Brabant, 91, Canadian baseball player (Philadelphia/Kansas City Athletics).
Chennupati Vidya, 84, Indian politician, MP for Vijayawada (1980–1984, 1989–1991), heart attack.
Henk Wesseling, 81, Dutch historian.

19
Khaira Arby, 59, Malian singer.
Bazlur Rahman Badal, 95, Bangladeshi folk dancer, Independence Day Award recipient (2017), pneumonia as a complication of COPD.
Vaughn Beals, 90, American businessman (Harley-Davidson).
Alan Boyson, 87–88, English muralist and sculptor.
Rafael Calventi, 86, Dominican architect and diplomat, heart attack.
Edoardo Catellani, 96, Italian politician, Senator (1968–1979).
Louis Gambaccini, 87, American civil servant, NJDOT commissioner, founding chairman of NJ Transit, general manager of SEPTA.
Alastair Gillespie, 96, Canadian politician and businessman.
Hong Chaosheng, 97, Chinese physicist, academician of the Chinese Academy of Sciences.
Darrow Hooper, 86, American shot-putter, Olympic silver medal (1952).
Miguel Irízar Campos, 84, Spanish Roman Catholic prelate, Bishop of Callao (1975–1995).
Joe Landrum, 89, American baseball player (Brooklyn Dodgers).
Margareta Niculescu, 92, Romanian artist, puppeteer, director and teacher.
Margaret Reid, 95, New Zealand religious leader, moderator of the General Assembly of the Presbyterian Church of Aotearoa New Zealand (1987).
Rosa Ríos, 83, Bolivian actress, stroke.
Pedro Roncal, 56, Spanish journalist, heart attack.
Rod Saddler, 52, American football player (St. Louis/Phoenix Cardinals, Cincinnati Bengals). 
Marisa Sánchez, 85, Spanish chef and gastronomist.

20
John N. Abrams, 71, American military officer, Commander of TRADOC (1998–2002).
Matthew Aid, 60, American author and historian, heart disease.
Richard D. Alexander, 88, American evolutionary biologist.
Ted Atkins, 60, British mountaineer, climbing accident.
Uri Avnery, 94, Israeli peace activist (Gush Shalom) and politician, member of the Knesset (1965–1974, 1979–1981), complications from a stroke.
Andrés Aylwin, 93, Chilean politician and human rights activist, Deputy (1965–1973, 1990–1998).
Turgut Berkes, 65, Turkish rock musician and artist.
Charles Blackman, 90, Australian painter.
Greg Boyed, 48, New Zealand television presenter (TVNZ).
Elizabeth Connell, 92, American gynecologist and obstetrician, heart failure.
Doc Edwards, 81, American baseball player (Kansas City Athletics) and manager (Cleveland Indians).
Ottó Heinek, 58, Hungarian politician and journalist, Chairman of the National Self-Government of Germans in Hungary (since 1999).
Chicha Mariani, 94, Argentinian human rights activist, co-founder of the Grandmothers of the Plaza de Mayo, stroke.
Antoinette Martignoni, 99, American artist.
Jimmy McIlroy, 86, Northern Irish football player (Burnley, national team) and manager (Oldham Athletic).
Fidelis Mhashu, 76, Zimbabwean politician, Minister of National Housing and Social Amenities (2009–2013), MP for Chitungwiza North.
Brian Murray, 80, South African Hall of Fame actor (Treasure Planet, Bob Roberts, Dream House) and theatre director.
Peter Nott, 84, British Anglican prelate, Bishop of Norwich (1985–1999).
Antonio Pischedda, 75, Italian actor and politician, Senator (1992–1994), complications from a stroke.
Jennifer Ramírez Rivero, 39, Venezuelan model and businesswoman.
Piloo Sarkari, 91, Indian Olympic cyclist.
Jacques Tétreault, 89, Canadian politician.
Eddie Willis, 82, American studio guitarist (The Funk Brothers), complications from poliomyelitis.
Craig Zadan, 69, American film producer (Chicago, Footloose, Hairspray), complications following shoulder surgery.

21
George Andrie, 78, American football player (Dallas Cowboys).
John Christgau, 84, American writer, heart attack.
Enrico De Angelis, 97, Italian singer (Quartetto Egie, Quartetto Ritmo, Quartetto Cetra).
Otávio Frias Filho, 61, Brazilian journalist, editorial director of Folha de S.Paulo (since 1984), pancreatic cancer.
Charles Gain, 94, American police officer, respiratory failure.
Barbara Harris, 83, American actress (The Apple Tree, Freaky Friday, Nashville), Tony winner (1967), co-founder of The Second City, lung cancer.
Spencer P. Jones, 61, New Zealand singer and guitarist (The Johnnys, Beasts of Bourbon, Sacred Cowboys), liver cancer.
Vesna Krmpotić, 86, Croatian writer and translator.
Donald Mackay, Baron Mackay of Drumadoon, 72, Scottish lawyer and politician, Lord Advocate (1995–1997).
Hanna Mina, 94, Syrian novelist.
Gerald Russell, 90, British psychiatrist.
Renzo Sclavi, 94, Italian politician, Senator (1983–1987).
Stefán Karl Stefánsson, 43, Icelandic actor (LazyTown), bile duct cancer.
Dean Stone, 88, American baseball player (Washington Senators).
John van Reenen, 71, South African discus thrower, AAA champion (1975), diabetes.
Vicente Verdú, 75, Spanish writer, journalist and economist.
Villano III, 66, Mexican professional wrestler (UWA, CMLL, AAA), cerebral infarction.
James Whittico Jr., 102, American physician.

22
Sergio Arredondo, 92, Chilean militant, member of the Caravan of Death, lung cancer.
Natan Bernot, 87, Slovenian slalom canoeist, world championship silver medalist (1963).
Chris Champion, 57, American professional wrestler (WCW, CWA, CWF), stroke.
Roger E. Combs, 73, American Air National Guard major general and judge.
DuWayne Deitz, 87, American football player and coach (St. Thomas).
Jeremy Geffen, 40, American entrepreneur, drug overdose.
Tullio Ilomets, 97, Estonian chemist and science historian.
Richard Kadison, 93, American mathematician.
Gurudas Kamat, 63, Indian politician, MP (2004–2014), heart attack.
Ed King, 68, American Hall of Fame guitarist (Strawberry Alarm Clock, Lynyrd Skynyrd) and songwriter ("Sweet Home Alabama"), lung cancer.
Lazy Lester, 85, American Hall of Fame blues musician, stomach cancer.
Bill McGrath, 81, Australian politician, Victorian MLA (1979–1999).
Joey Mente, 42, Filipino basketball player (San Miguel Beermen, Welcoat Dragons), cancer.
Krishna Reddy, 93, Indian artist.
Martin Shubik, 92, American economist.
Jesús Torbado, 75, Spanish writer.

23
Arcabas, 91, French painter.
Henry H. Arnhold, 96, American banker.
Ted Bennett, 93, English footballer (Queens Park Rangers, Watford, Great Britain Olympic team).
Yves-Marie-Henri Bescond, 94, French Roman Catholic prelate, Auxiliary Bishop of Corbeil (1971–1979) and Meaux (1979–1986).
Jim Condon, 60, American politician, Member of the Vermont House of Representatives (since 2004), esophageal cancer.
Brian Drebber, 68, American sportscaster (Speed), traffic collision.
Andriy Fedetskyi, 60, Ukrainian football player (Volyn Lutsk, Metalist Kharkiv, Gwardia Chelm) and manager.
Delio Gamboa, 82, Colombian footballer (Millonarios, Once Caldas, national team).
Cindy Haug, 61, Norwegian writer.
Russ Heath, 91, American comic book artist (Men of War, Little Annie Fanny, G.I. Combat), cancer.
Dieter Thomas Heck, 80, German television host (ZDF-Hitparade, Die Pyramide) and actor (Das Millionenspiel).
Oliver Hoare, 73, English art dealer, cancer.
Ron Hunt, 72, English footballer (Queens Park Rangers).
Wendy Hutton, 77, New Zealand travel and food writer.
Ann Ireland, 65, Canadian novelist, carcinoid syndrome.
Dominik Kalata, 93, Slovak Roman Catholic prelate, Titular Bishop of Semta (since 1985).
Eli Kassner, 94, Canadian guitar teacher and musician.
Yasser Al-Masri, 47, Jordanian actor (Dawa'er Hob: Circles of Love, Al-Gama'a), traffic collision.
Kuldip Nayar, 95, Indian journalist (The Statesman), human rights activist and politician, MP (1997–2003).
Mick O'Toole, 86, Irish racehorse trainer (Dickens Hill).
Dario Pegoretti, 62, Italian bicycle framebuilder, heart attack.
George Sheldon, 71, American politician, member of the Florida House of Representatives (1974–1982), complications from a fall.
Lance Thompson, 40, Australian rugby league player (St George Dragons, Cronulla Sharks).
Franck Venaille, 81, French poet and writer.
George Walker, 96, American composer (Lilacs), Pulitzer Prize recipient (1996), fall.
David Yallop, 81, British author, complications from Alzheimer's disease.

24
Stan Black, 62, American football player (San Francisco 49ers), traffic collision.
Andre Blay, 81, American film producer (Prince of Darkness, They Live, Village of the Damned).
Vijay Chavan, 63, Indian actor (Mumbaicha Dabewala), lung disease.
Lawrence J. DeNardis, 80, American politician, member of the U.S. House of Representatives (1981–1983), President of the University of New Haven (1991–2004).
Claudiomiro Estrais Ferreira, 68, Brazilian footballer (Internacional, Botafogo, national team).
Sherkhan Farnood, 57, Afghan banker (Kabul Bank) and poker player, heart attack.
Tom Frost, 81, American mountaineer and photographer, cancer.
Uri Katzenstein, 67, Israeli sculptor and musician, stroke.
Robin Leach, 76, British writer and television host (Lifestyles of the Rich and Famous), complications from a stroke.
Jeff Lowe, 67, American mountaineer, amyotrophic lateral sclerosis.
Princeton Lyman, 82, American diplomat, Ambassador to Nigeria (1986–1989) and South Africa (1992–1995), lung cancer.
James Mallinson, 74–75, English record producer.
Gordon McOmber, 98, American politician, Lieutenant Governor of Montana (1988–1989).
Stanley Morgan, 88, English novelist and actor (The Return of Mr. Moto).
Emiddio Novi, 72, Italian journalist and politician, MP (1994–2008), traffic collision.
Javier Otxoa, 43, Spanish cyclist, Paralympic champion (2004, 2008).
Aleksei Paramonov, 93, Soviet-born Russian football player (Spartak Moscow, national team) and manager (Étoile Sahel), Olympic champion (1956).
Antonio Pennarella, 58, Italian actor (The Butterfly's Dream, On My Skin, Noi credevamo).
Valentina Rastvorova, 85, Soviet-born Russian fencer, Olympic champion (1960) and silver medalist (1960, 1964), eight-time world champion.
Gordon Riddick, 74, English footballer (Luton Town, Gillingham, Brentford F.C.).
Trudy Stevenson, 73, Zimbabwean politician and diplomat, Ambassador to Senegal (since 2009).
Ivan Štraus, 90, Bosnian architect (Belgrade Museum of Aviation).
Sir Adrian Swire, 86, British businessman (Swire).
Ciril Zlobec, 93, Slovene poet, writer and politician.

25
Miyoko Asō, 92, Japanese actress and voice actress (Fullmetal Alchemist, Ranma ½, Sazae-san), senile dementia.
Florian Beigel, 76, German architect, cardiac arrest.
Rolf Yngvar Berg, 92, Norwegian botanist.
Dieudonné Bogmis, 63, Cameroonian Roman Catholic prelate, Bishop of Éséka (since 2004), stroke.
Art Bragg, 87, American Olympic sprinter (1952).
Con Cooney, 84, Irish hurler and coach.
Ruth Finley, 98, American publisher (The Fashion Calendar), respiratory failure.
S. H. Hasbullah, 67, Sri Lankan geographer and academic, heart attack.
Lindsay Kemp, 80, English dancer, choreographer (Ziggy Stardust) and actor (The Wicker Man, Valentino).
Karl F. Lopker, 66, American business executive (QAD, Deckers), prostate cancer.
John McCain, 81, American politician and Navy officer, member of the U.S. Senate (since 1987) and House of Representatives (1983–1987), glioblastoma.
Hari Chand Middha, 76, Indian politician, heart attack.
Meyer Rosen, 98, American politician, Member of the South Carolina House of Representatives (1963–1966).
Tadeusz Rudolf, 92, Polish economist and politician, Minister of Labor and Social Policy (1974–1979).
Noam Sheriff, 83, Israeli composer and conductor, heart attack.
Eugenio Tarabini, 88, Italian politician, MP (1968–1994), heart attack.
Vojtěch Varadín, 69, Slovak footballer (Spartak Trnava, Slovan Bratislava, Czechoslovakia national team).
Germán Villegas, 74, Colombian lawyer and politician, Mayor of Cali (1990–1992), Governor of Valle del Cauca (1995–1997, 2001–2003) and Senator (2006–2014), stroke.

26
Alyosha Abrahamyan, 72, Armenian footballer (Ararat Yerevan).
Federico Barbosa Gutiérrez, 66, Mexican jurist and politician, member of the Congress of the Union (2003–2006), heart attack.
Martin van Beek, 58, Dutch politician, Senator (2012–2015, 2017, since 2018).
Inge Borkh, 97, German soprano.
Gopal Bose, 71, Indian cricketer (Bengal, national team), heart attack.
Rosa Bouglione, 107, French circus performer.
Carlo Della Corna, 66, Italian football player (Varese, Udinese) and manager (Voghera), cancer.
Barrie Dunsmore, 79, American journalist (ABC News).
George J. Eade, 96, American Air Force general.
Odysseus Eskitzoglou, 86, Greek sailor, Olympic champion (1960).
K. K. Haridas, 52, Indian film director, heart attack.
Kerry Hill, 75, Australian architect.
Tony Hiller, 91, British songwriter ("United We Stand", "Save Your Kisses for Me", "Figaro") and producer.
Brahim Karabi, 84, Tunisian Olympic sprinter (1960).
Juhani Keto, 70, Finnish basketball player.
Cristina Marsans, 72, Spanish golfer.
Juraj Miklušica, 80, Czechoslovakian Olympic cyclist.
Thomas J. O'Brien, 82, American Roman Catholic prelate, Bishop of Phoenix (1982–2003), complications from Parkinson's disease.
Patrick Quilty, 79, Australian palaeontologist.
Hamsad Rangkuti, 75, Indonesian writer, complications from a stroke.
Neil Simon, 91, American playwright (Biloxi Blues, The Odd Couple) and screenwriter (The Goodbye Girl), Tony winner (1965, 1985, 1991), complications from pneumonia.

27
Alan Cairns, 88, Canadian political scientist.
Robert Churchhouse, 90, British mathematician.
Dale M. Cochran, 89, American politician, Secretary of Agriculture of Iowa (1987–1999), member of the Iowa House of Representatives (1965–1987).
Rohan Daluwatte, 77, Sri Lankan Army general, heart attack.
Tina Fuentes, 34, Spanish Olympic synchronised swimmer (2004), cancer.
Max Geuter, 80, German Olympic fencer (1964, 1968, 1972).
Aya Koyama, 45, Japanese professional wrestler (BJW, AJW) and mixed martial artist (Smackgirl), cancer.
Henry McNamara, 83, American politician, member of the New Jersey Senate (1985–2008).
S. Nagoor Meeran, 55, Indian politician, renal failure.
Olga Meyer, 88, Norwegian journalist.
Mirka Mora, 90, French-born Australian artist and cultural figure, complications from Alzheimer's disease.
Iolanda Nanni, 49, Italian politician, Deputy (since 2018), cancer.
Ron Newman, 82, British-born American soccer player (Atlanta Chiefs, Fort Lauderdale Strikers) and manager (San Diego Sockers).
Alfonso Osorio, 94, Spanish military lawyer and politician, Minister of Presidency (1975–1977) and Second Vice President (1975–1977).
Emil Rachev, 28, Bulgarian footballer (Burgas, Neftochimic Burgas, Rozova Dolina), heart attack.
Bobby Walden, 80, American football player (Minnesota Vikings, Pittsburgh Steelers).
Fredd Wayne, 93, American actor (The Spiral Road, Hangup, Bewitched).
Rupert Webb, 96, English cricketer (Sussex).
Stellan Westerdahl, 81, Swedish sailor, Olympic silver medalist (1972).
Murray Westgate, 100, Canadian actor (Happy Birthday to Me, Blue City Slammers, Scanners II: The New Order).

28
Ray Barry, 89, American-born Canadian ice hockey player (Boston Bruins).
Josep Fontana, 86, Spanish historian and academic (Pompeu Fabra University).
Andrew Hughes, 62, Australian police officer, Fijian Commissioner of Police (2003–2006), bowel cancer.
Maqbool Hussain, Pakistani war prisoner.
Tatyana Kuznetsova, 77, Soviet-born Russian cosmonaut. 
Nestorius Timanywa, 81, Tanzanian Roman Catholic prelate, Bishop of Bukoba (1973–2013).
Szczepan Wesoły, 91, Polish Roman Catholic prelate, Auxiliary Bishop of Gniezno (1968–2003).

29
Robin Birley, 83, British archaeologist (Vindolanda).
Jim Breithaupt, 83, Canadian politician.
Stan Brock, 82, British philanthropist, founder of Remote Area Medical.
Tony Camillo, 90, American record producer (Bazuka) and arranger.
Silvano Campeggi, 95, Italian film poster designer (Casablanca, Singin' in the Rain, Breakfast at Tiffany's).
Samuel Conti, 96, American judge (U.S. District Court for the Northern District of California).
Charley Ellis, 74, American Olympic boxer (1964).
Gary Friedrich, 75, American comic book writer (Sgt. Fury and his Howling Commandos, Captain Marvel), co-creator of Ghost Rider, complications from Parkinson's disease.
Ken Ford, 88, British sculptor.
Joseph P. Graw, 103, American politician, member of the Minnesota House of Representatives (1963–1974).
Nandamuri Harikrishna, 61, Indian actor and politician, traffic collision.
Elizabeth Kishkon, 87, Canadian politician, Mayor of Windsor, Ontario (1983–1985).
François Konter, 84, Luxembourgian footballer (Anderlecht, Gent, national team).
Erich Lessing, 95, Austrian photographer.
Ellie Mannette, 90, Trinidadian steelpan musician.
Sir James Mirrlees, 82, Scottish economist, Nobel Prize laureate (1996).
Peter Mond, 4th Baron Melchett, 70, British environmentalist and politician.
Tom Murphy, 81, Canadian politician, member of the Newfoundland and Labrador House of Assembly (1989–1996).
Carilda Oliver Labra, 96, Cuban poet.
Mihály Petrovszky, 67, Hungarian Olympic judoka.
Marie Severin, 89, American Hall of Fame comic book artist (Thor, Iron Man), co-creator of Spider-Woman, stroke.
Paul Spudis, 66, American geologist and planetary scientist, lung cancer.
David Sugarbaker, 65, American physician.
Paul Taylor, 88, American choreographer (Paul Taylor Dance Company), renal failure.
Kolya Vasin, 73, Russian author and collector of Beatles memorabilia, fall. 
Thomas Wiseman, 87, British author, playwright and screenwriter.
Sir Barry Wilson, 82, British admiral.

30
Peter Corris, 76, Australian author (Deep Water, That Empty Feeling, The Empty Beach) and historian.
Peter Frame, 61, American ballet dancer (New York City Ballet), suicide by jumping.
Jack Garrick, 90, New Zealand ichthyologist.
B. Jaya, 54, Indian film director (Gundamma Gaari Manavadu, Lovely) and actress, heart attack.
Joseph Kobzon, 80, Russian singer, People's Artist of USSR (1987), prostate cancer.
Ray Kubala, 75, American football player (Denver Broncos), amyotrophic lateral sclerosis.
Zohar Manna, 79, Israeli computer scientist.
Vanessa Marquez, 49, American actress (ER, Stand and Deliver, Wiseguy), shot.
Medicean, 21, British racehorse (Eclipse Stakes).
William Joseph Nealon Jr., 95, American judge (U.S. District Court for the Middle District of Pennsylvania).
Ray, 36, Hong Kong professional wrestler (WNC, JWP, Ice Ribbon), brain cancer.
David Watkin, 77, English architectural historian.

31
Susan Brown, 86, American actress (General Hospital, Santa Barbara, As the World Turns), complications from Alzheimer's disease.
Luigi Luca Cavalli-Sforza, 96, Italian population geneticist.
John M. Darley, 80, American social psychologist.
Brian Davis, 84, Australian politician, member of the Queensland Legislative Assembly (1969–1974, 1977–1989).
José Luis Dibildox Martínez, 75, Mexican Roman Catholic prelate, Bishop of Tarahumara (1993–2003) and Tampico (since 2003); chronic illness.
Marianne Eckardt, 105, German-born American psychoanalyst, translator and editor.
Mario Facco, 72, Italian football player (Lazio, Avellino) and manager (Frosinone).
Peter Hatendi, 91, Zimbabwean Anglican prelate, Bishop of Harare and Mashonaland (1979–1995), heart and lung disease.
Gloria Jean, 92, American singer and actress (The Under-Pup, Pardon My Rhythm, Manhattan Angel), heart failure.
Ian Jones, 86, Australian author and television producer.
Hans Keil, 74, Samoan politician, cancer.
Wolfgang Klausewitz, 96, German ichthyologist and marine biologist.
Amanda Kyle Williams, 61, American crime novelist, cancer.
Anita Lindman, 86, Swedish television announcer and producer (Anita och Televinken).
Elmar Pieroth, 83, German politician, member of the Bundestag (1969–1981).
Carole Shelley, 79, British actress (Wicked, The Elephant Man, Robin Hood), Tony winner (1979), cancer. 
Philip Short, 58, Irish chess player.
Phil Slosburg, 91, American football player (Boston Yanks, New York Bulldogs).
Alice Yotopoulos-Marangopoulos, 101, Greek criminologist and women's rights activist, President of the International Alliance of Women (1989–1996).
Alexander Zakharchenko, 42, Ukrainian separatist leader, President and Prime Minister of the Donetsk People's Republic (since 2014), bombing.

References

2018-08
 08